Gino Frederic Soupprayen Padiatty (born ) is a Mauritian male weightlifter, competing in the 56 kg category and representing Mauritius at international competitions. He participated at the 1996 Summer Olympics and at the 2000 Summer Olympics in the 56 kg event.

Major results

References

External links
 
 

1973 births
Living people
Mauritian male weightlifters
Weightlifters at the 1996 Summer Olympics
Weightlifters at the 2000 Summer Olympics
Olympic weightlifters of Mauritius
Place of birth missing (living people)